Green Lake Park, or Cui Hu Park, is an urban park in Kunming, Yunnan Province, China. It was established in the 20th century on the west side of the Wuhua Mountain and is sometimes described as a "Jade in Kunming".

The park consists, in effect, of a group of 4 small sub-lakes linked by bridges in the traditional style. The lake was originally a water reservoir for the city.

Green Lake is ringed by a street, and along the edge of that are restaurants and tea houses (some with rooftop dining), shops, and hotels, including the upscale Green Lake Hotel and Grand Park Hotel (formerly the Harbour Plaza Hotel).

Green Lake Park was visited during The Amazing Race 18 when the park was featured as the "Pit Stop" of the 5th leg.

The park is just below the main gate to Yunnan University.  The most famous building on the lake is Jiang Wu Tang, a tourist attraction.

Cuihu's Gulls
During the winter months, black-headed gulls from Siberia migrate to Green Lake and entertain the crowds of visitors as they circle around and snap up bread, usefully provided by a herd of local vendors, thrown up into the air by tourists. There are performances of pieces from Chinese operas and of folk music within and around the park.

Statue of Nie Er

Located in the park is the statue of one of Yunnan's most famous patriots - Nie Er, the composer of China's national anthem.

Gallery

References 
https://web.archive.org/web/20100419200355/http://www.kmtrip.net/en/city/kunming/attraction/cuihu.htm

Geography of Kunming
Parks in Yunnan
Urban public parks
17th-century establishments in China
Tourist attractions in Kunming
Lakes of Yunnan